"Happy Xmas (War Is Over)" is a Christmas song released in 1971 as a single by John & Yoko/Plastic Ono Band with the Harlem Community Choir. It was the seventh single release by John Lennon outside his work with the Beatles. The song reached number four in the UK, where its release was delayed until November 1972, and has occasionally re-emerged on the UK Singles Chart, most notably after Lennon's murder in December 1980, when it peaked at number two.

Also a protest song against the Vietnam War, "Happy Xmas (War Is Over)" has since become a Christmas standard, frequently recorded by other artists, appearing on compilation albums of seasonal music, and named in polls as a holiday favourite. In a UK-wide poll in December 2012, it was voted tenth on the ITV television special The Nation's Favourite Christmas Song.

Background 
"Happy Xmas (War Is Over)" was the culmination of more than two years of peace activism undertaken by John Lennon and Yoko Ono that began with the bed-ins they convened in March and May 1969, the first of which took place during their honeymoon. The song's direct antecedent was an international multimedia campaign launched by the couple in December 1969 – at the height of the counterculture movement and its protests against America's involvement in the Vietnam War – that primarily consisted of renting billboard space in 12 major cities around the world for the display of black-and-white posters that declared "WAR IS OVER! If You Want It – Happy Christmas from John & Yoko". Although a similar line had previously appeared in the 1968 anti-war songs "The War Is Over" by Phil Ochs and "The Unknown Soldier" by the Doors (which features the refrain "The war is over"), the use of "War is over" (minus the definite article) by Lennon and Ono may be coincidental; there is no evidence to confirm that they were acquainted with these earlier works, or if so whether they were influenced by them.

Recognising the accessibility and popular appeal that made his 1971 single "Imagine" more commercially successful than his other post-Beatles songs, Lennon concluded, "Now I understand what you have to do: Put your political message across with a little honey." He conceived "Happy Xmas (War Is Over)" as a means of elaborating upon the themes of social unity and peaceful change enacted through personal accountability and empowerment that served as the basis of the earlier billboard campaign, trying to convey optimism while avoiding the sentimentality that he felt often characterised Christmas songs. 
From 1963 to 1969, the Beatles had issued special recordings at Christmas directly to members of their fan club.  After the group disbanded in 1970, Lennon was the first former member to release an original Christmas song.  "Happy Xmas (War Is Over)" would be followed by George Harrison's "Ding Dong, Ding Dong" (1974), Paul McCartney's "Wonderful Christmastime" (1979) and Ringo Starr's album I Wanna Be Santa Claus (1999).

Recording 
In late October 1971, with not much more than bare-bones melody and half-formed lyrics, Lennon recorded an acoustic guitar demo of "Happy Xmas (War Is Over)" in his rooms at the St. Regis Hotel in New York City, where he and Ono were living. Ono would receive co-writing credit, but the actual extent of her contribution at this initial stage is unclear since she did not participate in the demo, which was atypical of their collaborations. Another demo of the song was made in late October after the couple had taken an apartment in Greenwich Village. Lennon brought in Phil Spector to help produce, as he had with his previous two albums, John Lennon/Plastic Ono Band and Imagine, which had been released in the US several weeks earlier. The first recording session was held on the evening of Thursday, 28 October, at the Record Plant studio. After the session musicians – some of whom had performed at one time or another as members of the Plastic Ono Band – laid down the basic instrumental backing and overdub tracks, Lennon and Ono added the main vocals. One of the four guitarists present filled in for bassist Klaus Voormann, whose flight from Germany had been delayed. The following day, Ono and the session musicians, including Voormann, recorded the single's B-side, "Listen, the Snow Is Falling". The Harlem Community Choir – 30 children, most of them four to twelve years of age – came to the studio on the afternoon of 31 October to record backing vocals for the counter-melody and sing-along chorus. Photographs for the original sleeve cover were also taken during that session by Iain Macmillan.

Composition 
The song begins with spoken Christmas greetings from Ono and Lennon to their children from previous marriages: Ono whispers, "Happy Christmas, Kyoko", then Lennon whispers, "Happy Christmas, Julian". Lyric sheets accompanying the compilation albums Shaved Fish (1975) and The John Lennon Collection (1982) erroneously transcribe this introduction as, "Happy Christmas, Yoko. Happy Christmas, John."

When Lennon first played his demo for Phil Spector, the producer remarked that the song's opening line, "So this is Christmas…", was rhythmically identical to the 1961 single "I Love How You Love Me" by the Paris Sisters, which Spector himself had produced. At the recording studio, Lennon instructed the guitarists to incorporate mandolin-style riffs similar to the ones heard in "Try Some, Buy Some", a single that Spector and George Harrison had produced in February 1971 for his wife, Ronnie Spector, formerly of the Ronettes. Spector also included percussion instruments of the sort he used on the 1963 album A Christmas Gift for You.

In addition to these reappropriated elements, the chords and melodic structure of "Happy Xmas (War Is Over)" are similar to the traditional English ballad "Skewball", but with a different rhythmic meter, subsequent modulations and a wholly new and different chorus countermelody. The verses of the song are closest in structure to the 1963 rendition (titled "Stewball") by Peter, Paul and Mary.

Release 
Apple Records released "Happy Xmas (War Is Over)" and "Listen, the Snow Is Falling" in America on 1 December 1971 (Apple 1842). Issued in 7" single format on transparent green vinyl with a card-stock picture sleeve, the pressing bore two label variations, one of which displayed a sequence of five images that showed Lennon's face transforming into Ono's. This sequence was originally featured on the reverse cover of the exhibition catalogue for Ono's career retrospective This Is Not Here, presented in October 1971 at the Everson Museum of Art in Syracuse, New York.

A dispute between music publisher Northern Songs and Lennon over publishing rights delayed the release of "Happy Xmas (War Is Over)" in the UK until 24 November 1972 (Apple R 5870). The initial British run was issued in 7" single format on opaque green vinyl with the picture sleeve and variant label, but it sold out quickly and had to be repressed on standard black vinyl.

The song's first album appearance was on Shaved Fish, the only compilation of Lennon's solo recordings released during his lifetime. "Happy Xmas" was coupled there with part of a live version of "Give Peace a Chance", performed as the finale of Lennon and Ono's One to One benefit concert on 30 August 1972. Designed by Roy Kohara, the album cover is composed of illustrations by Michael Bryan representing each song on the album; for "Happy Xmas (War Is Over)", the image shows an aeroplane dropping a Christmas ornament instead of a bomb.

Over the years, "Happy Xmas (War Is Over)" has been reissued in a number of single formats by Capitol, Geffen and Parlophone, sometimes in conjunction with the release of albums collecting Lennon's work. It has also appeared on compilations of Christmas songs, notably those from the Now That's What I Call Music! series.

A rough mix produced during the first recording session on 28 October 1971 was released in 1998 on the John Lennon Anthology.

Music videos
A music video for "Happy Xmas (War Is Over)" appeared on The John Lennon Video Collection, released on VHS in 1992, corresponding to the 1989 reissue of The John Lennon Collection. It consisted of images from Lennon and Ono's 1969 "War is Over!" billboard campaign and candid photographs of the couple and their son Sean from the late 1970s, interspersed with a boys' choral ensemble singing along with the original Harlem Community Choir vocals.

In 2003, a new video was created for the remastered 5.1 version of the song for the DVD Lennon Legend: The Very Best of John Lennon. This version is composed of documentary footage, mostly depicting children, from the Vietnam War, in addition to recent scenes from various conflicts in the Horn of Africa, the Bosnian War, the 11 September 2001 attack in New York City, and the US wars in Afghanistan and Iraq. This version has over 21 million views on YouTube.

Reception
On its US single debut in 1971, "Happy Xmas (War Is Over)" did not meet with much success. This was due to the single's late release, which resulted in limited airplay before Christmas, and a lack of promotion. The single peaked at number 36 on the Cash Box Top 100 Singles and number 28 on the Record World Singles Chart, and number 3 on the Billboard Christmas Singles chart. The single subsequently re-appeared on the Billboard Christmas charts in 1972, 1983, 1984, and 1985. The song appeared at number 32 on the Billboard Hot Adult Contemporary chart for the week ending 6 January 1996.

"Happy Xmas (War Is Over)" enjoyed immediate success in Britain when issued there in November 1972. The song peaked at number 4 on the UK Singles Chart and number 10 on the listings compiled by Melody Maker. Since then, it has re-entered the UK Singles Chart nine more times. The most notable of these instances occurred immediately following Lennon's death on 8 December 1980. The single peaked at number 2 – behind another reissued Lennon single, "Imagine" – and remained on the chart for nine weeks.

Between December 1972 and February 1973, the song entered the top ten in Australia, Belgium, Denmark, France, Ireland, the Netherlands, Norway, and Singapore.

Ultimate Classic Rock critic Nick DeRiso rated it as Lennon's 5th greatest solo political song, noting that "Lennon took the opportunity to encourage Yuletide revelers toward a broader sense of pacifism."

Other versions 
In 1985, Australian group the Incredible Penguins released a version of the song, which peaked at number 10 on the Australian singles chart in December 1985.

In later decades, "Happy Xmas (War Is Over)" has gained a higher profile in the cultural mainstream due to an increasing proliferation of recordings by other musical artists, most having been recorded during the last twenty years. Among these, two have entered the Billboard charts, both of them in the same year. The first was released on 17 October 2006 by Canadian singer-songwriter Sarah McLachlan along with her album Wintersong, which was the best-selling Christmas album of the year and a Grammy nominee. It features backing vocals from the Children's and Youth Choirs of the Music Outreach Program at the Sarah McLachlan School of Music in Vancouver, British Columbia. Entering the Billboard Adult Contemporary chart at number 22 on the week ending 9 December 2006, it climbed to a peak position of number 5, four weeks later. The second was released on 12 December 2006 by American rock band The Fray as a digital download. It debuted at number 50 on the Billboard Hot 100 and number 41 on the Pop 100 in the week ending 31 December 2006, but stayed on the respective charts for only one more week.

Some of the earliest of the other versions of "Happy Xmas (War Is Over)" appear on holiday albums released by major pop singers, such as I Still Believe in Santa Claus (1990) by Andy Williams, The Christmas Album (1992) by Neil Diamond,  and A Very Special Season (1994) by Diana Ross.

Other notable recordings of "Happy Xmas (War Is Over)" include a 1991 version on the album Standards by The Alarm, a 1994 in-concert performance by Melissa Etheridge, a 1995 Brazilian version by Simone, the 2002 version by South African band Toxic Shame, the 2002 Maybe This Christmas version from Sense Field. American pop rock band Maroon 5 released a cover in 2005, in support of Amnesty International's Make Some Noise campaign.Australian Singer Delta Goodrem recorded this song as a b-side on her 5th single Predictable. A 2009 version by mash-up band Beatallica on the album Winter Plunderband. On 13 December 2012, Sean Lennon performed the song with gospel singer Mavis Staples, Jeff Tweedy of the band Wilco, and the Harlem Gospel Choir on the Comedy Central program The Colbert Report. This version was made available for purchase on the music download site iTunes, and proceeds were donated to Hurricane Sandy disaster relief. During John Lennon 75th Birthday Concert Sheryl Crow, Aloe Blacc, and Peter Frampton performed the song with a children's chorus from The Stuttering Association for the Youth.

On 14 December 2018, Miley Cyrus and Mark Ronson recorded a version of the song featuring Lennon's son, Sean Ono Lennon. The three of them performed their cover on the 15 December 2018 episode of Saturday Night Live, where Ronson and Cyrus were booked as the episode's musical guests. In November 2019 John Legend released a new version of the song, including string arrangements by Matt Jones which featured an improvised solo by violinist Scott Tixier. It reached number nine in the UK Singles Chart.The song was also covered in late 2019 by two VTubers Hime Tanaka and Hina Suzuki.

A French version was recorded by René Simard and his little sister Nathalie entitled "Noël Des Enfants" from René's album 18 ans déjà.

Personnel 
 John Lennon – vocals, guitar, producer
 Yoko Ono – vocals, producer
 The Harlem Community Choir – backing vocals, Children's Choir 
 May Pang – backing vocals
 Nicky Hopkins – piano, chimes, glockenspiel
 Teddy Irwin – guitar
 Jim Keltner – drums, sleigh bells
 Hugh McCracken – guitar
 Chris Osbourne – guitar
 Stuart Scharf – guitar
 Roy Cicala – recording engineer
 Phil Spector – producer

Chart performance

Original version

Céline Dion version

Maroon 5 version

Miley Cyrus and Mark Ronson feat. Sean Ono Lennon version

John Legend version

Certifications

See also
 List of anti-war songs
 "The War Is Over", 1968 Phil Ochs song

Notes

References

Sources

External links 
 
 

1971 singles
1972 singles
1971 songs
Anti-war songs
Apple Records singles
British Christmas songs
Irish Singles Chart number-one singles
John Lennon songs
Plastic Ono Band songs
Songs of the Vietnam War
Song recordings produced by John Lennon
Song recordings produced by Yoko Ono
Song recordings produced by Phil Spector
Songs written by John Lennon